The Bendigo Box-Ironbark Region is a 505 km2 fragmented and irregularly shaped tract of land that encompasses all the box-ironbark forest and woodland remnants used as winter feeding habitat by swift parrots in the Bendigo-Maldon region of central Victoria, south-eastern Australia.

Description
The site lies between the Maryborough-Dunolly Box-Ironbark Region and Rushworth Box-Ironbark Region Important Bird Area (IBAs).  It includes much of the Greater Bendigo National Park, several nature reserves and state forests, with a few small blocks of private land.  It excludes other areas of woodland that are less suitable for the parrots.

Birds
The region was identified as an IBA because, when flowering conditions are suitable it supports up to 1100 non-breeding swift parrots.  It is also home to small populations of diamond firetails and non-breeding flame robins.  Other declining woodland birds recorded from the IBA include brown treecreepers, speckled warblers, grey-crowned babblers, Gilbert's whistlers, hooded and pink robins, crested bellbirds and black honeyeaters.

References

Important Bird Areas of Victoria (Australia)
Box-ironbark forest
Bendigo